Vasilios Pavlidis (born 4 September 2002) is a Greek professional footballer who plays as a defender for Dutch Eerste Divisie club TOP Oss on loan from Jong AZ.

Career
On 31 January 2023, Pavlidis joined TOP Oss on loan until the end of the season.

Personal life
His brother is Vangelis Pavlidis.

References

External links
 
 
 
 

2002 births
Living people
Footballers from Thessaloniki
Greek footballers
Greece youth international footballers
Association football defenders
FC Schalke 04 players
Jong AZ players
TOP Oss players
Bundesliga players
Eerste Divisie players
Greek expatriate footballers
Expatriate footballers in Germany
Greek expatriate sportspeople in Germany
Expatriate footballers in the Netherlands
Greek expatriate sportspeople in the Netherlands